The scale insect genus Desmococcus is a group in the family Pityococcidae, comprising two species from the western United States, feeding on pines. The type species is Desmococcus captivus

Notes

References
 
  Abstract and Table of Contents

Archaeococcoids
Hemiptera of North America
Sternorrhyncha genera